Gaby Nestler is a former East German cross-country skier who competed during the 1980s. She won a bronze medal in the 4 × 5 km relay at the 1985 FIS Nordic World Ski Championships in Seefeld and also finished 10th in the 20 km event at the 1987 FIS Nordic World Ski Championships in Oberstdorf.

Nestler earned one victory in a 10 km event in Les Saisies, France in 1986 which made her the youngest race winner in the World Cup history.

Cross-country skiing results
All results are sourced from the International Ski Federation (FIS).

World Championships
 1 medal – (1 bronze)

World Cup

Season standings

Individual podiums
1 victory 
2 podiums

Team podiums

 2 podiums

Note:   Until the 1999 World Championships and the 1994 Olympics, World Championship and Olympic races were included in the World Cup scoring system.

References

External links
World Championship results 

German female cross-country skiers
Living people
FIS Nordic World Ski Championships medalists in cross-country skiing
1967 births
People from Annaberg-Buchholz
Sportspeople from Saxony